Events from the year 1783 in Denmark.

Incumbents
 Monarch – Christian VII
 Prime minister – Ove Høegh-Guldberg

Events
 5 July  ''HDMS Friderichsværn is launched at Bodenhoffs Plads in Copenhagen.

Undated

Births
 2 January – Christoffer Wilhelm Eckersberg, painter (d. 1858)
 11 May – Peter Willemoes, naval officer (d. 1808)
 8 September – N. F. S. Grundtvig, pastor, author, poet, philosopher, historian, teacher and politician (d. 1872)
 8 October – Christian Molbech, historian and editor (d. 1857)

Deaths
 14 April – Abraham Pelt, industrialist and philanthropist (born 1695)
 15 June – Ludvig Harboe, theologian and bishop (born 1709)
 17 December – Gysbert Behagen, merchant (born 1725)

References

 
1780s in Denmark
Denmark
Years of the 18th century in Denmark